The Great Fire is the seventh studio album by American metalcore band Bleeding Through. The album was released by Rise Records on January 31, 2012. It was the band's last album before their split in 2014 and their reunion in 2018.

Background 
The band planned to write and record their seventh studio album once they come back from touring. They planned to release the yet to be titled album anywhere from mid to late 2011, which bassist Ryan Wombacher explained in a November 2010 interview:

On November 14, 2011, the band announced that the name of their new record would be called "The Great Fire". On November 30, 2011, they announced that the album was complete, although no release date has been stated. On December 14, 2011, the release date was revealed to be January 31, 2012.

Track listing 

DVD
 Live show from Chain Reaction, California

Personnel 
Bleeding Through
 Brandan Schieppati – lead vocals
 Brian Leppke – guitars
 Dave Nassie – guitars
 Ryan Wombacher – bass, backing vocals
 Marta Peterson – keyboards, piano
 Derek Youngsma – drums, percussion

Production
 Cameron Miller – backing vocals
 Mick Kenney – producer, engineering, mixing, mastering
 Brandan Schieppati – producer
 Erol Ulug – engineering (drums)
 Ola Englund – engineering (guitars)
 Dan Mumford – artwork, design

References 

Bleeding Through albums
2012 albums
Rise Records albums